BR-153 is a major federal highway of Brazil, officially named the Transbrasiliana Highway. It also serves as part of the Belém–Brasília Highway in the stretch located between the cities of Wanderlândia, in the state of Tocantins, and Anápolis, in the state of Goiás.

It crosses Brazil in a north–south direction, starting in São Domingos do Araguaia, in the state of Pará and ending in Aceguá, in the state of Rio Grande do Sul on the Brazil/Uruguay border. The highway, highly variable in quality and traffic, cuts through the states of Pará, Tocantins, Goiás, Minas Gerais, São Paulo, Paraná, Santa Catarina and Rio Grande do Sul.

Duplication 
A 315 km section between Anápolis and Monte Alegre de Minas has already been duplicated.

In 2020, the Federal Government plans to grant 850.7 km of the highway to the private sector, in the Anápolis (GO) section to Aliança (TO), to double 623.4 km of the section.

Gallery

See also
Paleorrota Geopark
 Belém–Brasília Highway
 Brazilian Highway System
 Route 8 (Uruguay)

References

External links
 BR-153 Highway. Ministry of Transport of Brazil.

Federal highways in Brazil